Morton Haack (June 26, 1924 – March 22, 1987) was an American costume designer who was perhaps best known for his work on the original Planet of the Apes.

Academy Award nominations

Filmography

Massacre in Rome (1973) (production designer)
What's the Matter with Helen? (1971)
Beneath the Planet of the Apes (1970)
Buona Sera, Mrs. Campbell (1968)
Planet of the Apes (1968)
Games (1967)
Walk Don't Run (1966)
The Unsinkable Molly Brown (1964)
Billy Rose's Jumbo (1962)
Come September (1961)
Please Don't Eat the Daisies (1960)
Money, Women and Guns (1958)
Wild Heritage (1958)

References

External links

1924 births
1987 deaths
American costume designers
People from Los Angeles